William May (date of birth unknown – 5 August 1888) was an English cricketer.  May's batting style is unknown.  He was christened at Linton, Kent on 20 April 1808.

May made a single first-class appearance for Kent against England at the West Kent Cricket Club Ground in 1834.  May was dismissed by Tom Marsden for 3 runs in Kent's first-innings total of 127.  In response England made 130, while in Kent's second-innings he was dismissed for 3 runs by William Lillywhite, with Kent making just 35 runs.  This left England with a target of 33, which was chased down for the loss of just one wicket.  This was his only major appearance for Kent.

He died at Linton, Kent on 5 August 1888.

References

External links

1888 deaths
People from Linton, Kent
English cricketers
Kent cricketers
Year of birth missing